Idigh (also written Idirh) is a village in the commune of Tamtert, in Béni Abbès District, Béchar Province, Algeria. The village is located on a local road on the north-eastern bank of the Oued Saoura, about halfway between Tamtert and El Ouata.

References

Neighbouring towns and cities

Populated places in Béchar Province